Tai Tam Bay is a bay in the Tai Tam area, in the southeastern part of Hong Kong Island, in the Southern District of Hong Kong.

Geography
Tai Tam Bay cover a marine area of about 8 km². It comprises a narrow inlet to the inner bay area, named Tai Tam Harbour, as well as a much wider middle and outer bay. While the average water depth within Tai Tam Harbour is about 3 m, the water depth increases from 5 m in the middle bay to 9 m in the outer bay. The width of the opening of the bay is about 2.2 km.

The western point of the bay is Tai Tai Head or Tai Tam Tau at the southern end of Stanley Peninsula, while the eastern point of entrance is Cape D'Aguilar on the southeastern end of D'Aguilar Peninsula.

To Tei Wan is a small bay located on the eastern side of Tai Tam Bay. It is the site of the small . At the time of the 1911 census, the population of To Tei Wan was 54.

References

Further reading
  

Tai Tam
Bays of Hong Kong